Emil Hoppe (2 April 1876 – 14 August 1957) was an Austrian architect. His work was part of the architecture event in the art competition at the 1928 Summer Olympics.

References

1876 births
1957 deaths
20th-century Austrian architects
Olympic competitors in art competitions
Architects from Vienna